Techno India, Durgapur, is a private school in Durgapur, West Bengal, India.

History
It was established in 2015.

Engineering colleges in West Bengal
Universities and colleges in Paschim Bardhaman district
Colleges affiliated to West Bengal University of Technology
Educational institutions established in 2015
2015 establishments in West Bengal